Asian Highway 142  is a highway that is part of Asian Highway Network. It was never signposted in Malaysia, although it is part of Asian Highway Network. It goes along the MEC Highway (Malaysian Federal Route 222), Tun Razak Highway (Malaysian Federal Route 12), and Federal Route 1.

References

Asian Highway Network